Arctocyonians (Arctocyonia; also known as "Procreodi") are a clade of laurasiatherian mammals whose stratigraphic range runs from the Palaeocene to the Early Eocene epochs.  They were among the earliest examples of major mammalian predators after the Cretaceous–Paleogene extinction event. While some classify arctocyonians as stem-artiodactyls, others have classified the group as members of Ferae. There are three families classified in the order: Arctocyonidae, Oxyclaenidae, and Quettacyonidae.

References

Paleocene first appearances
Prehistoric mammals